Animal Planet is a television channel which launched locally in Australia exclusively on Optus Television in October 1999. The channel is dedicated to programming that highlights the relationship between humans and animals. It has since expanded to multiple carriers.

It was added to Foxtel on 1 December 2003 in Australia and screen on Sky in New Zealand.

It was formerly available on SelecTV from March 2007 until the closure of its English service in late 2010. It was available on Fetch TV until 1 February 2015. It would later be re-added to the platform on 1 May 2020.

Programming Highlights 

Crikey! It's the Irwins
 Dodo Heroes
 Dr. Jeff: Rocky Mountain Vet
 Jeremy Wade's Dark Waters
 Pit Bulls & Parolees
 Puppy Bowl
 The Aquarium
 The Zoo (2016)
 Evan Goes Wild
 Extinct or Alive
 Scaled
 Secret Life of the Zoo
 Bondi Vet
 Tanked
 Hanging with the Henderson's
 The Vet Life
Animal Planet also hosts some David Attenborough content.

References

Animal Planet
Television networks in Australia
Television channels and stations established in 1999
English-language television stations in Australia
English-language television stations in New Zealand
Television channels in New Zealand
Television channel articles with incorrect naming style
1999 establishments in Australia
Warner Bros. Discovery Asia-Pacific